Depuis le jour may refer to:

, an 1899 encyclical of Pope Leo XIII on the education of the clergy
"Depuis le jour", the most famous aria from Louise (opera) (Gustave Charpentier, 1900)